The 2021 Yale Bulldogs football team represented Yale University in the 2021 NCAA Division I FCS football season as a member of the Ivy League. The team was led by ninth-year head coach Tony Reno and played its home games at the Yale Bowl. Yale's 63-point win against Brown on November 6 was the Bulldogs' most single-game points under coach Reno. Yale averaged 13,263 fans per game.

Schedule

References

Yale
Yale Bulldogs football seasons
Yale Bulldogs football